The 1958–59 DDR-Oberliga season was the 11th season of the DDR-Oberliga, the top level of ice hockey in East Germany. Seven teams participated in the league, and SG Dynamo Weißwasser won the championship.

Regular season

References

External links
East German results 1949-1970

Ger
1958 in East German sport
1959 in East German sport
DDR-Oberliga (ice hockey) seasons
Ober